Sai Keng is a village of in the Shap Sze Heung area of Sai Kung North, in Tai Po District, Hong Kong, located near the shore of Three Fathoms Cove.

Administration
Sai Keng is a recognized village under the New Territories Small House Policy.

References

External links

 Delineation of area of existing village Sai Keng (Sai Kung North) for election of resident representative (2019 to 2022)

Villages in Tai Po District, Hong Kong
Sai Kung North